Clyde J Dotson (n.d-1982) was a Baptist missionary who served in Zimbabwe when it was still Rhodesia and led the formation of the Rhodesian Mission Board and the Baptist Convention of Zimbabwe. Dotson died in 1982 and was buried in Alabama.

Background 
Dotson was born in Alabama. He served as pastor of Town Creek Baptist Church in Town Creek Alabama Leighton Baptist Church and Courtland Baptist Church before his service in Africa.

Serving at Rusitu Mission (1931-1950) 
Dotson was commissioned in 1931, when he was assigned by the South Africa Mission Board to join other missionaries serving at Rusitu Mission in Chimanimani District. Shortly after he arrived, he was appointed to be the leader of the mission station. He served for 20 years but in 1949 he had a disagreement with the other missionaries and he left Rusitu Mission, becoming an independent missionary with his wife.

Working with the Southern Baptist Convention (1950-1972) 
After working for a short time as an independent missionary, the Dotsons were appointed by the Foreign Mission Board (FMB) now International Mission Board (IMB) of the Southern Baptist Convention (SBC) in 1950. The FMB was planning its first denominational work in Rhodesia and the Dotsons were the first missionaries appointed by the FMB in Rhodesia. In the 1951 SBC Annual Congress, Dotson encouraged the SBC to send more missionaries and resources to reach out to the blacks in Southern Rhodesia. At this time there were only four Baptist churches which allowed white people only. Dotson led the establishment of Sanyati Mission, many clinics which include Sasame, Chinyenyetu, Manyoni, Chireya and Chinyenyetu, the Baptist Theological Seminary of Zimbabwe and the Baptist Convention of Zimbabwe. He left Zimbabwe in 1972 because of his deteriorating health and returned to America.

Family life 
Dotson married three times and was widowed twice. His first wife Hattie was killed in a motorcycle accident in Harare on March 3, 1955. Dotson then married Ebbie who died during child birth on 1 January 1958. Rev Dotson was living in Mutare at this time and on this day he spent the night praying on one of Mutare town hills. In the morning he told people that he had been shown Calvary by God. In 1958 he met his third wife Anneli, a native of Finland who had moved to South Africa to serve as a missionary. The two married in 1960 before moving to serve in Zimbabwe. Anneli worked as a registered nurse and midwife. She felt called to missionary work at the age of ten.

Legacy 
Dotson pioneered the work of Southern Baptist Convention in Zimbabwe resulting in the formation of the Baptist Convention of Zimbabwe. Through his efforts Sanyati Baptist Hospital was built and a number of clinics in Gokwe. There is a hall at Baptist Conference Centre named after him and his helper J Nyathi.

References 

Baptist missionaries in Zimbabwe
People from Alabama
1982 deaths